FC Avangard Kamyshin was a Russian football team from Kamyshin. It played professionally from 1991 to 1994, including one season (1993) in the second-highest Russian First Division.

External links
  Team history at KLISF

Association football clubs established in 1958
Association football clubs disestablished in 1997
Defunct football clubs in Russia
Sport in Kamyshin
1958 establishments in Russia
1997 disestablishments in Russia